Jason Edward Cain (born March 31, 1985) is a professional basketball player who currently plays for Petro de Luanda in the Angolan Basketball League.

Career
Formerly, he played in the University of Virginia Cavaliers, mostly playing significant minutes during his third and fourth years. Cain helped the Virginia team in reach the NCAA tournament in the 2006–07 season. 

In 2008, Cain started his professional career by playing for the New Yorker Phantoms Braunschweig in the German Basketball Bundesliga (BBL).

In 2014, Cain signed with Petro de Luanda from Angola and went on to win the 2015 FIBA Africa Clubs Champions Cup with the club.

In September, Petro de Luanda announced Cain was returning to the team.

References

External links
LEB Oro profile
German League profile

1985 births
Living people
American expatriate basketball people in Angola
American expatriate basketball people in Germany
American expatriate basketball people in Spain
Basketball Löwen Braunschweig players
Basketball players from Philadelphia
Básquet Coruña players
Centers (basketball)
Atlético Petróleos de Luanda basketball players
Power forwards (basketball)
Virginia Cavaliers men's basketball players
American men's basketball players